This is a list of electoral results for the electoral district of Stawell and Ararat in Victorian state elections.

Members for Stawell and Ararat

Election results

Elections in the 1940s

Elections in the 1930s

Elections in the 1920s

Elections in the 1910s

References

Victoria (Australia) state electoral results by district